The Villa Palagonia is a patrician villa in  Bagheria, 15 km from Palermo, in Sicily, southern Italy. The villa itself, built from 1715  by the architect  Tommaso Napoli  with the help of Agatino Daidone, is one of the earliest examples of Sicilian Baroque. However, its popularity comes mainly from the statues of monsters with human faces that decorate its garden and its wall, and earned it the nickname of "The Villa of Monsters" (Villa dei Mostri).

This series of grotesques, created from 1749 by Francesco Ferdinando II Gravina, Prince of Palagonia, aroused the curiosity of the travellers of the Grand Tour during the 18th and 19th centuries, for instance Henry Swinburne, Patrick Brydone, John Soane, Goethe, the Count de Borde, the artist Jean-Pierre Houël or Alexandre Dumas, prior to fascinate surrealists like André Breton or contemporary authors such as Giovanni Macchia and Dominique Fernandez, or the painter Renato Guttuso.

In 1885, the villa was bought by private individuals, who are still in its possession, and is partially open to the public.

Villa Palagonia has been one of the venues for music concerts held within the framework of the Concert Season of Bagheria (Stagione Concertistica Città di Bagheria) initiative since 2017, with free entrance.

Palagonìa and Mineo 
Palagonìa and Mineo are a rocky area rich of caverns escaved and adhibited to be funerary tombs. One of them, the tomb 15 of Mineo (St. Febronia), has an inscription with letters high 8.5/6 cm on the right side and 13/10 cm on the left one. Palegraphic studies of the funerary public inscriptions are the unique available methodology to date Sicilian tombs back to the VII century BC. Similar archeological findings were held in Licodia Eubea, Sciri (with relevant affinities to the etruscan Tarquinia) and Mendolito (Adrano), showing a close connection between the Sicels and the population living in the central Italy like the Etruscans.

Sources

 Claude Arthaud, Les Palais du rêve, Arthaud, 1970  
 Michel-Jean, comte de Borch, Lettres sur la Sicile et sur l'île de Malte, 1782 Extraits en ligne
  Patrick Brydone, A Tour Through Sicily and Malta: In a Series of Letters to William Beckford, Esq. of Somerly in Suffolk (1st ed. 1773)
  Alexandre Dumas, Impressions de voyage
  Dominique Fernandez, Le Radeau de la Gorgone (Promenades en Sicile), photographies de Ferrante Ferranti, Grasset, 1988
  Dominique Fernandez, Le Voyage d'Italie (Dictionnaire amoureux), photographies de Ferrante Ferranti, Plon, 1997
  Goethe, Voyage en Italie, 1787
  P. Hachet, Psychanalyse d'un choc esthétique : La villa Palagonia et ses visiteurs, L'Harmattan, 2002
  Giovanni Macchia, Le Prince de Palagonia, Quai Voltaire, 1987
  Dacia Maraini, Retour à Bagheria, Seuil, 2004
  E. H. Neil, Architecture in context : The Villas of Bagheria, Sicily, Harvard University, 1995
  Madeleine Pinault, Catalogue de l'exposition Houël, Voyage en Sicile, 1776-1779, musée du Louvre, RMN
  Mario Praz, Bellezza e bizzarria, 1960
  Mario Praz, Le Jardin des sens, Christian Bourgois, 1975
  F. Santapà,  Villa Palagonia a Bagheria, Palermo, Palma, 1968
  R. Scaduto, Villa Palagonia: storia e restauro, Bagheria, E. M. Falcone, 2007
  Ferdinando Scianna, La Villa dei mostri, Einaudi, 1977
  Henry Swinburne, Travels in the Two Sicilies, 1777-1780, Cadell & Elmsly, London, 1790
  N. Tedesco, Villa Palagonia, Palermo, 1988
  Angheli Zalapì, Demeures de Sicile, préface de Gioacchino Lanza Tomasi, photographies de Melo Minnella, Könemann, 2000

Filmography 
 Several scenes of L'Avventura (1960), by Michelangelo Antonioni, with Monica Vitti, were filmed at the Villa Palagonia.
 In The Wedding Director (2006), by Marco Bellocchio, Sami Frey plays the part of a descendant of the Prince Gravina di Palagonia.
 Filming of the scenes from "L'Avventura" are featured in "Baaria" (2009) which is set in Bagheria by director Giuseppe Tornatore

See also 
 Villa Spedalotto
 Palazzo Valguarnera-Gangi
 Villa Francia

References

External links 

  Villa Palagonia - official site
  Villa Palagonia: Photos and info 
 LIFE Magazine (May 8, 1950) article

Houses completed in 1715
Palagonia
Baroque architecture in Palermo
Buildings and structures in the Province of Palermo
Museums in Sicily
Historic house museums in Italy
Visionary environments
Bagheria
1715 establishments in Italy